Michelle Boisseau (October 26, 1955 – November 15, 2017) was an American poet.

Life and career

Boisseau was born in Cincinnati, Ohio on October 26, 1955. She attended Ohio University, where she receiver a BA in 1977 and an MA in 1980, and the University of Houston where she received her PhD in 1985. She began teaching at the University of Missouri-Kansas City in 1995.

She published her first collection of poetry, No Private Life in 1990. This was followed by Understory in 1996 which won the Samuel French Morse Poetry Prize. She published Trembling Airs in 2003, A Sunday in God-Years in 2009 and Among the Gorgons in 2016. She has also published a textbook called Writing Poems and her work also appeared in publications such as Poetry, The Yale Review and The Cincinnati Review.

She was awarded with a Guggenheim Fellowship in 2017 for her work.

She died on November 15, 2017 from lung cancer.

Bibliography

 Among the Gorgons (2016) 
 A Sunday in God-Years (2009) 
 Tremblimg Air (2003) 
 Understory (1996) 
 No Private Life (1990)

References

1955 births
2017 deaths
American women poets
Writers from Cincinnati
Ohio University alumni
University of Houston alumni
University of Missouri–Kansas City faculty
Deaths from lung cancer in Kansas
American women academics
21st-century American women